Rory M. McVeigh is an American sociologist, Nancy Reeves Dreux Chair professor of sociology and director of the Center for the Study of Social Movements and former chair (2007-2016) of the department of sociology at the University of Notre Dame. From 2015 through 2020 he served as one of the lead editors of the American Sociological Review, the flagship journal of the American Sociological Association. He is widely cited in the field of social movements, particularly right-wing movements. He also edited the academic journal Mobilization from 2008 through 2015 and is the current the co-editor of the academic blog Mobilizing Ideas.

Career

McVeigh received his bachelor's in sociology from the University of Arizona in 1991 before moving on to University of North Carolina, Chapel Hill, where he received a master's in sociology 1993 and a Ph.D. in sociology in 1996. During his time at Chapel Hill, McVeigh was an associate editor of the academic journal Social Forces. He then took the position as Assistant Professor of sociology at Skidmore College from 1997 through 2002 and then at the University of Notre Dame. At Notre Dame, he was promoted to Associate Professor with tenure in 2005 and to Full Professor in 2009. In 2017, he became the Nancy Reeves Dreux Chair Professor of sociology.

McVeigh's 2008 co-authored article Red Counties, Blue Counties, and Occupational Segregation by Sex and Race received an honorable mention for the 2008 American Sociological Association Political Sociology Best Article Award.

McVeigh's book, entitled The Rise of the Ku Klux Klan:  Right-Wing Movements and National Politics was published by the University of Minnesota Press in 2009. The book went on to be reviewed by over a dozen academic journals and news outlets. According to reviewers Heidi Beirich and Kevin Hicks, "The work offers a sophisticated new explanation of the quick rise of an organization that, at its height, numbered more than three million."

In 2009, McVeigh became the editor of the academic journal Mobilization: An International Quarterly a post he held until 2015.

Along with co-editors Omar Lizardo, and Sarah Mustillo, McVeigh edited the American Sociological Review from 2015-2020 , the flagship journal of the American Sociological Association. This is the top journal in the field of Sociology, and the editorship rotates every five years.

McVeigh's second book, entitled The Politics of Losing: Trump, the Klan, and the Mainstreaming of Resentment, was published by Columbia University Press in 2019.

References 

American sociologists
University of Notre Dame faculty
University of Arizona alumni
University of North Carolina alumni
Academic journal editors
Living people
1959 births
American Sociological Review editors